The following low-power television stations broadcast on digital or analog channel 4 in the United States:

 K04BJ-D in La Pine, Oregon
 K04DH-D in Gunnison, Colorado
 K04GF-D in Wolf Point, Montana
 K04GT-D in Bullhead City, Arizona
 K04GW-D in Spearfish, South Dakota
 K04HF-D in Panaca, Nevada
 K04HH-D in Aspen, Colorado
 K04IH-D in Baker, Montana
 K04JF-D in Nulato, Alaska
 K04JH-D in Homer, Alaska
 K04JZ-D in Gold Hill, Oregon
 K04KP-D in Northway, Alaska
 K04KV-D in Unalaska, Alaska
 K04LB-D in Pelican, Alaska
 K04LZ-D in Galena, Alaska
 K04MG-D in Wedderburn, etc., Oregon
 K04MM-D in Hyder, Alaska
 K04MN-D in Wales, Alaska
 K04MR-D in Gustavus, Alaska
 K04MT-D in Newtok, Alaska
 K04NK-D in Dolores, Colorado
 K04ON-D in Weber Canyon, Colorado
 K04OO-D in Ismay Canyon, Colorado
 K04OS-D in Reedsport, Oregon
 K04PJ-D in Hesperus, Colorado
 K04QC-D in Palermo, California
 K04QP-D in Casas Adobes, Arizona
 K04QR-D in Esparto, California
 K04QV-D in Thompson Falls, Montana
 K04QX-D in Townsend, Montana
 K04RP-D in Delta Junction, Alaska
 K04RS-D in Salinas, California
 K04RT-D in Judith Gap, Montana
 K04RU-D in Long Valley Junction, Utah
 K04RW-D in Cedar Canyon, Utah
 K04RX-D in Preston, Idaho
 K04RY-D in Colorado Springs, Colorado
 K04SA-D in Alexandria, Louisiana
 K04SB-D in Bakersfield, California
 K04SD-D in Victoria, Texas
 K04SE-D in Parker, Arizona
 K04SF-D in Gustine, California
 K14QH-D in Butte Falls, Oregon
 K41LF-D in Salina & Redmond, Utah
 KAHO-LD in Woodville, Texas
 KAKZ-LD in Cathedral City, California
 KBIS-LD in Turlock, California
 KHFW-LD in Dallas, Texas
 KQSL-LD in San Rafael, California
 KRMF-LD in Reno, Nevada
 KTFB-CA in Bakersfield, California
 W04AG-D in Garden City, etc., Virginia
 W04BS-D in Bethel, Maine
 W04DN-D in Auburn, Alabama
 W04DW-D in Sylva, etc., North Carolina
 W04DY-D in Maple Valley, Michigan
 W04DZ-D in Sutton, West Virginia
 W24EI-D in Naranjito, Puerto Rico
 WAUG-LD in Raleigh, North Carolina
 WBXF-CA in Des Moines, etc., Iowa
 WGCI-LD in Skowhegan, Maine
 WHDT-LD in Boston, Massachusetts
 WKPZ-CD in Pennington Gap, Virginia
 WMDF-LD in Miami, Florida
 WNHT-LD in Alabaster, Alabama
 WOCK-CD in Chicago, Illinois
 WPXO-LD in East Orange, New Jersey
 WTSP (DRT) in St. Petersburg, Florida
 WVDO-LD in Carolina, Puerto Rico
 WWAY-LD in Wilmington, North Carolina

The following low-power stations, which are no longer licensed, formerly broadcast on digital or analog channel 4:
 K04AI in Prescott, Arizona
 K04AU in Panguitch, Utah
 K04BN in Teasdale/Torrey, Utah
 K04BO in Marysvale, Utah
 K04BR in Green River, Utah
 K04CV in Broken Bow, Nebraska
 K04CX in Cascadia, Oregon
 K04DD-D in Weaverville, California
 K04DS-D in Kenai River, Alaska
 K04EG in Trenton, Nebraska
 K04EK in Orderville, Utah
 K04EN in Glenns Ferry, Idaho
 K04EY in Grants Pass, etc., Oregon
 K04EZ in Big Bend, etc., California
 K04FF in Forsyth, etc., Montana
 K04FR in Escalante, Utah
 K04FT in Mazama, Washington
 K04GA in Kings River, Nevada
 K04GB in Fort Bidwell, California
 K04GD in Beowawe, etc., Nevada
 K04GP-D in Alyeska, Alaska
 K04GR in Dorena, etc., Oregon
 K04GS in Crested Butte, etc., Colorado
 K04HE in Yreka, etc., California
 K04HK in Black Butte Ranch, Oregon
 K04HL in Ord, Nebraska
 K04HM in St. Paul Island, Alaska
 K04HN in Manila, etc., Utah
 K04HV in Sand Point, Alaska
 K04HX in Ridgecrest, etc., California
 K04IG in Kiana, Alaska
 K04IK in Noorvik, Alaska
 K04IN in Tropic, etc., Utah
 K04IR in Wainwright, Alaska
 K04IT in Point Lay, Alaska
 K04IU in Kaktovik, Alaska
 K04IW in East Price, Utah
 K04JD in Salida, etc., Colorado
 K04JR in Starr Valley, Nevada
 K04JW in Unalakleet, Alaska
 K04KG in Gateway, Colorado
 K04KN in King Salmon, Alaska
 K04KQ in Klukwan, Alaska
 K04KS in Barrow, Alaska
 K04KU in Ruby, Alaska
 K04KX in Slana, Alaska
 K04LE in Stebbins, Alaska
 K04LI in Arctic Village, Alaska
 K04LJ in Atka, Alaska
 K04LK in Akutan, Alaska
 K04LN in Takotna, Alaska
 K04LT in Deering, Alaska
 K04LU in Buckland, Alaska
 K04MB in Nikolai, Alaska
 K04MK in Chefornak, Alaska
 K04MO in Hoonah, Alaska
 K04MQ in Paxson, Alaska
 K04MV in Point Baker, Alaska
 K04MW in Pitkas Point, Alaska
 K04ND in Alakanuk, Alaska
 K04NU in Seiad Valley, California
 K04OF-D in Sargents, Colorado
 K04OH in Challis, Idaho
 K04OJ in Ticaboo, Utah
 K04OM in Collbran, Colorado
 K04OZ in Oljeto, Utah
 K04PH in Astoria, Oregon
 K04PI in Bluff & area, Utah
 K04PP in Navajo Mtn. Sch., etc., Utah
 K04RA-D in Clarksville, Arkansas
 KCDH-LP in Winnfield, Louisiana
 KDLN-LP in Newport, Oregon
 KFIQ-LP in Lubbock, Texas
 KJBW-CA in Springdale, Arkansas
 KVFR-LP in Redding, California
 W04AE in Herkimer, New York
 W04CI in Appomattox, Virginia
 W04CW in Tigerton, etc., Wisconsin
 W04DE in Laurel, Mississippi
 WLWP-LP in Millsboro, etc., Delaware

References

04 low-power